Sandringham School is a secondary school with academy status in Marshalswick, St Albans, Hertfordshire. It was established in 1988 following a merger of two local schools, Marshalswick School and Wheathampstead School. It occupies the former Marshalswick site, adjacent to Wheatfields Infant and Junior schools. The former Wheathampstead site was used as a training centre by Hertfordshire County Council until 2007, and has now been redeveloped into housing.

The school works in partnership with two neighbouring schools to enhance post-16 educational provision. This partnership is known as "BeauSandVer" and consists of Sandringham School, Verulam School and Beaumont School.

Sandringham school primarily serves neighbourhoods in the north east of St Albans (Marshalswick and Jersey Farm) and the villages of Sandridge and Wheathampstead.

Predecessor schools

The two schools which became Sandringham School were Marshalswick School and Wheathampstead School. The Marshalswick school buildings were built in the 1960s, and the school expanded in the 1970s. Wheathampstead School opened in 1965 and closed in 1988.

Inspection judgements

As of 2022, the school has not yet been inspected by Ofsted since it became an academy in 2012. Before academisation, its last inspection was in 2008, with the judgement of Outstanding.

Achievements and recognition
The school has specialisms in Arts, Science and Leading Edge.

The school has also been awarded High Performing Specialist School status by the SSAT on three successive occasions. It has received the School Achievement Award.

The school is an Accredited Initial Teacher Training Provider (AITTP) which offers QTS through the GTP programme.

The school has hosted a world record attempt for the largest lesson.

On 8 January 2016, pupils from the school made the first amateur radio call to a British astronaut at the International Space Station, contacting Tim Peake as part of his Principia mission during Expedition 46.

House system
The school introduced a house system in 2005 with 6 houses named after famous people. These were called Brunel, Descartes, Einstein, King, Shakespeare and da Vinci. 

The names were changed in 2012 to Boudica, Darwin, Erikson, Knight, Seacole and Van Gogh.

Most recently, in 2017, they were changed again, to British figures:
Boudica became Johnson
Darwin became Newton
Erikson became Austen
Knight became Fawcett
Seacole became Elgar
Van Gogh became Turing
The new seventh house was named Shakespeare.

As of the 2019-20 Academic year, a new house was introduced - Hepworth House, named after the famous sculptor.

Each house is led by two Co-Heads of House (staff) assisted by House Captains and a House Committee (students).
 
The Houses compete against each other to win annual events such as sports day, house drama, house music, house dance and house photography. Students are also awarded House Points for high quality work and conduct in lessons. 

The total number of points for each House is used to determine which house is the winner of the House competition.
 
The winners of the house competition thus far:
2005-2006 Descartes
2006-2007 Brunel
2007-2008 Einstein + King
2009-2010 Einstein
2010-2011 Brunel
2011-2012 Brunel
2012-2013 Brunel
2013-2014 Darwin
2014-2015 Darwin
2015-2016 Van Gogh
2016-2017 Van Gogh
2017-2018 Newton
2018-2019 Austen
2019-2020 Austen
2020-2021 Johnson

SandPit Theatre
The School has used its specialism in the Arts to build and maintain a professional quality theatre on site. Opened in 2001 (at a cost of £1,000,000) the SandPit is used by the school and community and hosts productions and charity events. The SandPit is also used as a teaching space and as a venue for school assemblies.

References

External links
  Sandringham School
 Sandpit Theatre
 BeauSandVer
 Sandringham School, formerly Marshalswick School (local history site)

Academies in Hertfordshire
Educational institutions established in 1988
Schools in St Albans
Secondary schools in Hertfordshire
1988 establishments in England